The canton of Lescar, Gave et Terres du Pont-Long is an administrative division of the Pyrénées-Atlantiques department, southwestern France. It was created at the French canton reorganisation which came into effect in March 2015. Its seat is in Lons.

It consists of the following communes:
Arbus
Artiguelouve
Lescar
Lons
Poey-de-Lescar
Siros
Uzein

References

Cantons of Pyrénées-Atlantiques